Stephen Dale Starring (born July 30, 1961) is a former professional American football Wide Receiver and return specialist who played six seasons in the National Football League (NFL). 

After attending Vinton High School, Starring played quarterback for McNeese State University. He was MVP for the Cowboys football team at the 1980 Independence Bowl and 1980 Offensive Player of the Year of the Southland Conference (SLC), gaining 1,980 yards of total offense, including 974 rushing yards, a school record for rushing yards by a QB.  Starring finished his time at McNeese state with 3,083 passing yards (7th all time) and 1,906 rushing yards (12th). He also won three SLC track and field titles, two in the high hurdles and one in the long jump, and was named All-American for track and field.

In 1984, Starring was drafted by the Patriots in the 3rd round of the NFL draft.  He went on to play wide receiver for six seasons for the New England Patriots, Detroit Lions, and Tampa Bay Buccaneers. In 1986 he was the NFL's 7th leading kickoff returner with 1,012 kick return yards and went on to play in Super Bowl XX as a member of the Patriots, where he caught two passes for thirty-nine yards and returned 7 kickoffs for 153 yards. He was inducted into the McNeese State University Hall of Fame in 2000.  Starring finished his career with 120 receptions for 2,029 yards and 11 touchdowns, along with 2,389 yards returning kickoffs.

References

1961 births
Living people
American football wide receivers
Detroit Lions players
McNeese Cowboys football players
New England Patriots players
Players of American football from Baton Rouge, Louisiana
Tampa Bay Buccaneers players